Noura Mostafa Qadry (Egyptian pronunciation:Noura Mostafa Adry), more commonly known simply as Noura, (born in June 18, 1954 as Elweya Mostafa Mohamed Adry) is a retired Egyptian actress. She began her career in Egyptian cinema during the 1970s and continued acting until she retired in the 1990s, and wore the Hijab (Islamic Scarf), living a religious life now.

Early life
Noura is born in Cairo to Egyptian parents in the middle class district of Shubra. She is the sister of the actress Poussi. Since the 1990s, she rejected any media appearance and is living a quiet life as a Muslim devout.

References

External links 
 

1954 births
Egyptian Muslims
Egyptian television actresses
Egyptian film actresses
Actresses from Cairo
Living people